Galiniera saxifraga is a species of tree or small shrub native to the highlands of eastern and central Africa.

Range and habitat
Galiniera saxifraga is an Afromontane species, found in the Ethiopian Highlands and the Eastern Rift highlands of Kenya and Tanzania, the Albertine Rift highlands of Uganda, Democratic Republic of the Congo, Rwanda, Burundi, and Tanzania, and the Southern Rift highlands at the northern end of Lake Malawi in Tanzania, Malawi, and Zambia.

It is mostly found in humid upper montane forests between 1,700 and 3,000 meters elevation, occasionally ranging into lower montane forests down to 760 meters elevation.

References

Afromontane flora
Flora of Ethiopia
Flora of Kenya
Flora of Uganda
Flora of Tanzania
Flora of Burundi
Flora of Rwanda
Flora of the Democratic Republic of the Congo
Flora of Malawi
Flora of Zambia
Octotropideae